The Stroud and District Combination Junior Cup is an annual rugby union knock-out club competition organised by the Stroud and District Combination – one of the five bodies that make up the Gloucestershire Rugby Football Union.  It was first introduced during the 1976–77 season, with the inaugural winners being Royal Agricultural College II.  For the 2004–05 season a Junior Plate competition was introduced (Painswick RFC donated the plate) for teams that were knocked out of the first round of the Junior Cup, with Tetbury being the first winners.  The Junior Cup is the second most important cup in Stroud District, behind the Senior Cup but ahead of the Bill Adams Cup.  With only 9 member clubs the combination is one of the smallest in Gloucestershire.

The Junior Cup is currently open to the 1st teams of lower ranked clubs in Stroud District as well as 2nd teams of the larger clubs.  The format is a knock-out cup with quarter finals, semi-finals and a final to be held at a neutral ground between March–May.  Clubs knocked out at the quarter-final stage enter the Junior Plate competition which has a semi-final and final – also played at the same ground and date as the Junior Cup final.

Stroud and District Combination Junior Cup winners

Stroud and District Combination Junior Plate winners

Number of wins

Cup
Cirencester II (9)
Dursley II (9)
Royal Agricultural College II (3)
Cainscross II (2)
Fairford (2)
Painswick II (2)
Stroud II (2)
Minety II (1)
Tetbury (1)

Plate
Cirencester II (3)
Stroud II (3)
Fairford (2)
Caincross (1)
Dursley II (1)
Painswick (1)
Painswick II (1)
Tetbury (1)

Notes

See also
 Gloucestershire RFU
 Stroud & District Combination Senior Cup
 Stroud & District Combination Bill Adams Cup
 English rugby union system
 Rugby union in England

References

External links
 Gloucestershire RFU

Recurring sporting events established in 1976
1976 establishments in England
Rugby union cup competitions in England
Rugby union in Gloucestershire